Knowledge about military technology of the Viking Age (late 8th to mid-11th century Europe) is based on relatively sparse archaeological finds, pictorial representation, and to some extent on the accounts in the Norse sagas and laws recorded in the 14th century.

According to custom, all free Norse men were required to own weapons, and permitted to carry them at all times. Indeed, the Hávamál, purported to be sage advice given by Odin, states "Don't leave your weapons lying about behind your back in a field; you never know when you may need all of sudden your spear."

As war was the most prestigious activity in Viking Age Scandinavia, beautifully finished weapons were an important way for a warrior to display his wealth and status. A wealthy Viking would likely have a complete ensemble of a spear, a wooden shield, and either a battle axe or a sword. Battle axes were considered the "normal weapon" for middle class Vikings. Swords were normally reserved for upper class and nobles. Much poetry was associated with Viking weapons. The richest might have a helmet and mail armour; these are thought to have been limited to the nobility and their professional warriors (retainers). Several layers of thick woollen clothing may have been used by poorer warriors. The average farmer was likely limited to a spear, shield, and perhaps a common axe or large knife (seax). Some would also bring their hunting bows (mostly long bow or flat bow) to use in the opening stages of battle.

Weapons

Knife 

Two distinct classes of knives were in use by Vikings. These are found in most graves, being the only weapon allowed for all, even slaves. Smaller versions served as the everyday utility tool, while longer versions were likely meant for hunting or combat or both. Weapon knives sometimes had ornamental inlays on the blade. The construction was similar to traditional Scandinavian knives. The tang ran through a more or less cylindrical handle, the blade was straight with the edge sweeping upward at the tip to meet the back of the blade in a point. The knife apparently played an important role for all Scandinavians. This is evidenced by the large number of knives found in burial sites of not just the men, but the women and the children too.

The other type was the seax. The type associated with Vikings is the so-called broken-back style seax. It was usually a bit heavier than the regular knife and would serve as a machete- or falchion-like arm. A wealthier man might own a larger seax, some being effectively swords. With the single edge and heavy blade, this somewhat crude weapon would be relatively simple to use and produce, compared to the regular sword. A rather long tang is fitted to many examples, indicating they may have had a longer handle for two-handed use. The smaller knife-like seaxes were likely within the fabrication ability of a common blacksmith.

The Seax was in widespread use among the Migration period Germanic tribes, and is even eponymous of the Saxons. It appears in Scandinavia from the 4th century, and shows a pattern of distribution from the lower Elbe (the Irminones) to Anglo-Saxon England. While its popularity on the continent declines with the end of the Migration period, it remained in the British Isles where it was taken up by the Vikings. The large, sword-like seaxes are primarily found in connection with Viking settlements in England and Ireland, but do not appear very commonly in Scandinavia.

Sword 

The Viking Age sword was for single-handed use to be combined with a shield, with a double edged blade length of up to 90 cm. Its shape was still very much based on the Roman spatha with a tight grip, long deep fuller and no pronounced cross-guard. It was not exclusive to the Vikings, but rather was used throughout Europe

Swords were very costly to make, and a sign of high status. They were rarely used and some swords found in graves were probably not sturdy enough for battle or raiding, and instead were likely decorative items. Like Roman spathae, they were worn in leather-bound wooden scabbards suspended from a strap across the right shoulder. Early blades were pattern welded, a technique in which strips of wrought iron and mild steel were twisted and forged together, with the addition of a hardened edge. Later blades of homogeneous steel, imported probably from the Rhineland, many bearing inlaid makers' marks and inscriptions, such as INGELRII or VLFBERHT. Local craftsmen often added their own elaborately decorated hilts, and many swords were given names, such as Leg-biter and Gold-hilt. The sword grip was usually made of an organic material, such as wood, horn, or antler (which does not often survive for archaeological uncovering), and may well have been wound around with textile.

Owning a sword was a matter of high honour. Persons of status might own ornately decorated swords with silver accents and inlays. Most Viking warriors would own a sword as one raid was usually enough to afford a good blade. Most freemen would own a sword with goðar, jarls and sometimes richer freemen owning much more ornately decorated swords. The poor farmers would use an axe or spear instead but after a couple of raids they would then have enough to buy a sword. One sword mentioned in the Laxdæla saga was valued at half a crown, which would correspond to the value of 16 milk-cows. Constructing such weapons was a highly specialized endeavour and many sword-blades were imported from foreign lands, such as the Rhineland. Swords could take up to a month to forge and were of such high value that they were passed on from generation to generation. Often, the older the sword, the more valuable it became.

A distinct class of early single edged swords is known from Eastern Norway at the time. These had the same grips as the double edged swords, and blades of comparable length. The blades varied from long and slim, like the more common two edged swords, to somewhat heavy, giving the weapon a more cleaver-like balance. Confusingly, the same finds are sometimes classified as "sabres" or "seaxes" in English literature.

As mentioned above, a sword was so valued in Norse society that good blades were prized by successive generations of warriors. There is even some evidence from Viking burials for the deliberate and possibly ritual "killing" of swords, which involved the blade being bent so that it was unusable. Because Vikings were often buried with their weapons, the "killing" of swords may have served two functions, namely a ritualistic function in retiring a weapon with a warrior, and a practical one in deterring any grave robbers from disturbing the burial in order to get one of these costly weapons. Indeed, archaeological finds of the bent and brittle pieces of metal sword remains testify to the regular burial of Vikings with weapons, as well as the habitual "killing" of swords.

Axe 
 The most common hand weapon among Vikings was the axe – swords were more expensive to make and only wealthy warriors could afford them. The prevalence of axes in archaeological sites can likely be attributed to its role as not just a weapon, but also a common tool. This is supported by the large number of grave sites of female Scandinavians containing axes. Several types of larger axes specialized for use in battle evolved, with larger heads and longer shafts, including various types of bearded axes. The larger forms were as long as a man and made to be used with both hands, called the Dane Axe. Some axe heads were inlaid with silver designs. In the later Viking era, there were axe heads with crescent shaped edges measuring up to  called breiðöx (broadaxe). The double-bitted axes depicted in modern "Viking" art would have been very rare as it used more material and was seen as a waste during hard times, if they existed at all. No surviving examples, authentic artwork or clear descriptions from records support the existence of double-bitted axes used by Vikings. Double-bitted axes were not forged by the Norse. Just about every axe they forged was single headed.

Vikings most commonly carried sturdy axes that could be thrown or swung with head-splitting force. The Mammen Axe is a famous example of such battle-axes, ideally suited for throwing and melee combat.

An axe head was mostly wrought iron, with a steel cutting edge. This made the weapon less expensive than a sword, and was a standard item produced by blacksmiths, historically.

Like most other Scandinavian weaponry, axes were often given names. According to Snorri Sturluson's Prose Edda, axes were often named after she-trolls.

Spear 

The spear was the most common weapon of the Scandinavian peasant class. Throwing spears were constantly used by the warrior class; despite popular belief, it was also the principal weapon of the Viking warrior, an apt fit to their formations and tactics. They consisted of metal heads with a blade and a hollow shaft, mounted on wooden shafts of two to three metres in length, and were typically made from ash wood. The spear heads could measure between twenty and sixty centimetres with a tendency towards longer heads in the later Viking Age. Spear heads with wings are called krókspjót (hooked spear) in the sagas. Some larger-headed spears were called höggspjót (chopping spear) and could also be used for cutting. The barbed throwing spears were often less decorated than the ostentatious thrusting spears, as the throwing spears were often lost in battle.

The spear was used both as a throwing weapon and as a thrusting weapon, although there was some specialization in design. Lighter, narrower spearheads were made for throwing; heavier broader ones, for stabbing.
Most evidence indicates that they were used in one hand. Limited evidence from a saga indicates that they may have been used with two hands, but not in battle. The head was held in place with a pin, which saga characters occasionally pull out to prevent a foe from re-using the weapon.

Compared with a sword, the spear can be made with inferior steel and far less metal overall. This made the weapon cheaper and probably within the capability of a common blacksmith to produce. Despite this, the spear held great cultural significance to the Viking warrior, as the primary weapon of Odin, the king of the Norse gods and the god of warfare, was the spear Gungnir. The Eyrbyggja saga alludes that a customary start to a battle included throwing a spear right over the enemy army to claim it for Odin. Possibly due to its cultural significance, pattern welded blades are common in spear heads, and the sockets were often decorated with silver inlaid patterns.

Other polearms 

A polearm known as the atgeir is mentioned in several sagas of Icelanders and other literature. Atgeir is usually translated as "halberd", akin to a glaive. Gunnar Hámundarson is described in Njáls saga as cutting and impaling foes on his atgeir.

Several weapons (including the kesja and the höggspjót) appearing in the sagas are Viking halberds. No weapon matching their descriptions have been found in graves. These weapons may have been rare, or may not have been part of the funerary customs of the Vikings. A more likely explanation however is that these polearms are descriptions of early medieval weapons that have been added into the sagas; likely because they were written down during the same period.

Sling 
The Viking age sling was easy to manufacture, consisting of a rope and sometimes a leather cup to assist with loading, giving many of the lower class access to a formidable weapon. Slingers make effective light infantry due to their lack of heavy equipment and open formation, and the concussive effect of slingstones even through metal armour.

Bows and arrows 

The bow and arrow was used for both hunting and warfare. They were made from yew, ash or elm. The draw force of a 10th-century bow may have reached some 90 pounds force (400 N) or more, resulting in an effective range of at least  depending on the weight of the arrow. A yew bow found at Viking Hedeby, which probably was a full-fledged war bow, had a draw force of well over 100 pounds. Replica bows using the original dimensions have been measured to between  draw weight. Illustrations from the time show bows being pulled back to the chest, rather than to the corner of the mouth or under the chin, as is common today.

Arrowheads were typically made from iron and produced in various shapes and dimensions, according to place of origin. Most arrowheads were fixed onto the arrow shaft by a shouldered tang that was fitted into the end of a shaft of wood. Some heads were also made of wood, bone or antler. Evidence for eagle feather flights has been found with the feathers being bound and glued on. The end of the shaft was flared with shallow self nocks, although some arrows possessed bronze cast nocks. The historical record also indicates that Vikings may have used barbed arrows, but the archaeological evidence for such technology is limited.

The earliest find of these relics were found in Denmark, seemingly belonging to the leading-warrior class based on the graves in which they were found.

Shields

Round shields 
The shield was the most common means of defence. The sagas specifically mention linden wood for shield construction, although finds from graves show mostly other timbers, such as fir, alder and poplar with steel or iron shield boss. These timbers are not very dense and are light in the hand. They are also not inclined to split, unlike oak. Also, the fibres of the timber bind around blades preventing the blade from cutting any deeper unless a lot more pressure is applied. In conjunction with stronger wood, Vikings often reinforced their shields with leather or, occasionally, iron around the rim.

The smaller shield sizes came from the pagan period for the Saxons and the larger sizes from the 10th and 11th centuries. Most shields are shown in illuminations as being painted a single colour although some have a design painted onto them; the most common designs are simple crosses or derivations of sun wheels or segments. The few round shields that survived have much more complicated designs painted on them and sometimes very ornate silver and gold work applied around the boss and the strap anchors.

The Gokstad ship has places for shields to be hung on its railing and the Gokstad shields have holes along the rim for fastening some sort of non-metallic rim protection. These were called shield lists and they protected ship crews from waves and the wind. Some Viking shields may have been decorated by simple patterns although some skaldic poems praising shields might indicate more elaborate decoration and archaeological evidence has supported this. In fact, there is a complete subgenre of Skaldic poetry dedicated to shields, known as "shield poems", that describe scenes painted on shields. For example, the late-9th-century skaldic poem, Ragnarsdrápa, describes some shields painted with mythological scenes. Viking shields were also heavily used in formations. The shield wall or skjaldborg was a main formation in which accomplished Viking warriors would create a line of interlocked shields and thrust spears at adversaries. Other notable tactics included the svinfylking "boarsnout", in which warriors would create a wedge configuration and attempt to burst through the front line of nearby foes.

Kite shields 

It has been proposed that the medieval era kite shield favoured by the Normans was introduced to Europe by the Vikings. However, no documentation or remains of kite shields from the Viking period have been located by archaeologists.

Armor

Helmet 

The remains of six helmets from the Viking Age are known to exist:

 the Tjele helmet fragment;
 two fragments from Gotland;
 one fragment from Kyiv;
 the Gjermundbu helmet;
 and the Yarm helmet, which is the first Anglo-Scandinavian helmet discovered in Britain, found in Yarm, in the North Riding of Yorkshire, England.

Of the four helmet fragments found in Scandinavia, only the remains from Gjermundbu were of use in significant reconstruction.

The Gjermundbu helmet dates to the 10th century.  It was excavated on a farm called Gjermundbu in Ringerike in central Norway. Gjermundbu is located in Haugsbygd, a village in northeast of Hønefoss, in Buskerud, Norway. This helmet was made of iron from four plates after the spangenhelm pattern. This helmet has a rounded cap, and there is evidence that it also may have had a mail aventail. It has a "spectacle" guard around the eyes and nose which formed a sort of mask, which suggests a close affinity with the earlier Vendel Period helmets.

The Yarm helmet was discovered in the 1950s by workmen digging pipe trenches in Chapel Yard, Yarm, near the River Tees. Research led by Chris Caple of Durham University, and published in 2020, established that the helmet dates to the 10th century. This helmet is made of iron bands and plates, riveted together, with a simple knop at the top. Below the brow band it has a "spectacle" guard around the eyes and nose forming a sort of mask, which suggests an affinity with earlier Vendel Period helmets. The lower edge of the brow band is pierced with circular holes, where a mail curtain (or aventail) may have been attached.

From runestones and other illustrations, it is known that the Vikings also wore simpler helmets, often caps with a simple noseguard. Research indicates that Vikings may have only rarely used metal helmets. Helmets with metal horns, presumably for ceremonial use, are known from the Nordic Bronze Age, 2,000 years prior to the Viking Age.

Despite popular culture, there is no evidence that Vikings used horned helmets in battle as such horns would be impractical in a melee, but it is possible that horned head dresses were used in ritual contexts. The horned and winged helmets associated with the Vikings in popular mythology were the invention of 19th-century Romanticism. The horned helmet may have been introduced in Richard Wagner's Ring operas (set in Germany): The male chorus wore horned helmets, while the other characters had winged helmets.

Chain mail 
Once again, a single fragmented but possibly complete mail shirt has been excavated in Scandinavia, from the same site as the helmet—Gjermundbu in Haugsbygd. Scandinavian Viking Age burial customs seems to not favour burial with helmet or mail armour, in contrast to earlier extensive armour burials in Sweden Valsgärde or possibly only a small amount of Vikings could afford it. Probably worn over thick clothing, a mail shirt protected the wearer from being cut, but offered little protection from blunt trauma and stabbing attacks from a sharp point such as that of a spear. The difficulty of obtaining mail armour resided in the fact that it required thousands of interlinked iron rings, each one of which had to be individually riveted together by hand. As a result, mail was very expensive in early medieval Europe, and would likely have been worn by men of status and wealth.

Hjortspring boat contained several incomplete suits of mail.

The mail worn by Vikings was almost certainly the "four-on-one" type, where four solid (punched or riveted) rings are connected by a single riveted ring. Mail of this type is known as a byrnie from Old Norse brynja. Given scarcity of archeological evidence for Viking armor and the fact that Vikings on a raid tried to avoid pitched battles, it's possible that mail was primarily worn only by the professional warriors going into battle, such as the Great Heathen Army of the mid-9th century in England or at Harald Hardrada's invasion of Northumbria at the Battle of Fulford in 1066, and wealthy nobles.

Lamellar 
More than 30 lamellae (individual plates for lamellar armour) were found in Birka, Sweden, in 1877, 1934 and 1998–2000. They were dated to the same approximate period as the Gjermundbu mailshirt (900‒950) and may be evidence that some Vikings wore this armour, which is a series of small iron plates laced together or sewed to a stout fabric or leather cats shirt. There is considerable debate however as to whether the lamellae in question were in the possession of a Scandinavian resident or a foreign mercenary.

Cloth and leather 

Quilted cloth (a gambeson) is conjectured as possible options for lower-status Viking warriors, though no reference to such are known from the sagas. Such materials survive poorly in graves, and no archaeological finds have been made. Some runestones depict what appears to be armour which is likely not chain mail. The armour in question may have been the lamellar armour mentioned above, or may not have been armour at all. Several layers of stout linen or hemp canvas would provide a good level of protection, at reasonable expense, as would winter clothing made from thick woollen cloth. Practical experience with maille also suggests an undergarment of some sort would have been worn between the maille and the regular tunic, to protect the latter from dirt and excessive wear, but the descriptions of the effect of axes in the Sagas indicate such garments were lightly padded if at all.

Leather was far pricier during the period than today and thus less affordable for the casual warrior. In the Legendary Saga of St. Olaf, the kingsbane Thorir Hund is said to have worn a tunic made from reindeer fur, enchanted by "Finns" (Sámi), defending him from sword blows. The tunic is described as "magically" enhanced which may indicate that it may not represent a typical example of such a garment. Leather clothing does, however, occasionally turn up in archaeological finds, and would have offered some degree of protection in combat.

All in all, the case for non-metal forms of armour remains inconclusive. It is likely that the average Viking fought whilst wearing ordinary clothing, with the shield as the only form of protection.

Foreign origins of Viking arms and armour 

Foreign-made, specifically Frankish, weapons and armour played a special role in Norse society. Norsemen attained them either through trade (an extension of gift-giving in Norse society) or as plunder. Therefore, their possession and display by any individual would signify their station in the social hierarchy and any political allegiances they had. One example of an exchange of weapons between the Franks and the Vikings occurred in 795 when Charlemagne exchanged weapons with the Anglo-Saxon king Offa of Mercia.

Scandinavian affinity towards foreign arms and armour during the Viking Age had an eminently practical aspect. Norse weapon designs were obsolete and sources of iron within Scandinavia were of poor quality. Frankish swords like the VLFBERHT had a higher carbon content (making them more durable) and their design was much more manoeuvrable compared to Scandinavian-produced swords. Although smaller weapons like daggers, knives, and arrowheads could be manufactured in Scandinavia, the best swords and spearheads were undoubtedly imported.

Many of the most important Viking weapons were highly ornate—decorated lavishly with gold and silver. Weapons adorned as such served large religious and social functions. These precious metals were not produced in Scandinavia and they too would have been imported. Once in Scandinavia, the precious metals would have been inlaid in the pommels and blades of weapons creating geometric patterns, depictions of animals, and (later) Christian symbols.

Vikings also used foreign armour. According to Heimskringla, one hundred Vikings appeared "in coats of ring-mail, and in foreign helmets" at the Battle of Nesjar in 1016.

During the mid-9th century, there was an influx of these high-quality weapons into Scandinavia, and Frankish arms became the standard for all Vikings. As Ahmad ibn Fadlan observed in his account of his journey to Russia, every Viking carried a "sword of the Frankish type". The Franks attempted to limit the Vikings' use of weapons and armour produced in Francia—fearing that they would eventually face equally armed opponents. Chapter 10 of the Capitulare Bononiense of 811 made it illegal for any clerical functionary to supply swords or armour to non-Frankish individuals. Laws like this were enacted throughout Francia. Ultimately, in 864, King Charles the Bald of West Francia made the practice punishable by death.

Some scholars have proposed that such laws proved so effective at stemming the flow of Frankish weapons that they initiated the practice of raiding for which Vikings became notorious.

Saga accounts

Battles 
 Battle of Hafrsfjord
 Battle of Hastings
 Battle of Hjörungavágr
 Battle of Svolder
 Battle of Nesjar
 Battle of Stiklestad
 Battle of Remich
 Sack of Santiago de Compostela

Duels 
 Kormáks saga, holmgang of Kormák and Bersi

See also 
 Anglo-Saxon warfare
 Gothic and Vandal warfare
 Norman invasions
 Shieldmaidens
 Viking raid warfare and tactics
 Leidang

References 

 Keynes, Simon and Lapige, Michael. Alfred the Great: Asser's life of king Alfred. New York: penguin Books, 1983, Print.
 Short, William R. Viking Weapons and Combat Techniques.Yardley, Pennsylvania: Westholmet Publishing, 2009. print
 Sprague, Martina. Norse Warfare.New York:Hippocrene Books Inc, 2007. print.
 Poems of the Vikings,:the Elder Edda, translated by Terry, Patricia. New York: The Bobbs Merrill Company, print

Further reading 
 Oakeshott, R. Ewart (1996) The Archaeology of Weapons, Arms and Armour from Prehistory to the Age of Chivalry (New York: Dover Publications Inc.) 
 Hynson, Colin (2009) In Viking Times (Men, Women & Children)(Wayland Publishers Ltd.) 
 Sawyer, Peter (ed) (1997) The Oxford Illustrated History of the Vikings (Oxford University Press) 
 Kane, Njord (2015) The Vikings: The Story of a People (Spangenhelm Publishing)

External links 
 Viking Age Arms and Armor (hurstwic.org)
 Arms and Combat in the Íslendingasögur
 Viking Weapons and Warfare (bbc.co.uk)
 The 'Viking Shield' from Archaeology by Peter Beatson
 Viking Helmet from Gjermundbu, Norway
 Metropolitan Museum of Art

Arms and armour
Medieval weapons
Medieval armour